Sung Wong Toi is an important historic relic in Ma Tau Chung, Kowloon, Hong Kong. While its remaining portion is now located in the Sung Wong Toi Garden at the junction of Ma Tau Chung Road and Sung Wong Toi Road, it was originally a 45-metre-tall boulder standing on the top of Sacred Hill in Ma Tau Chung above Kowloon Bay.

Etymology
The name Sung Wong Toi literally means Terrace of the Sung kings. The stone is believed to have been a memorial to the last two boy emperors of the Southern Song dynasty, Zhao Shi and Zhao Bing, who temporarily lived in Hong Kong from 1277 to 1279.
In historical maps and documents, Sung Wong Toi is also known as Hill of the King of the Sung and Song Wong Toi in some occasions.

History

Song dynasty

According to historical records, when the child emperors Zhao Shi and Zhao Bing of the Song dynasty were fleeing south when the Song Empire was gradually being conquered by the Yuan dynasty in the late 13th century, they took refuge at the Sacred Hill along the seashore. Zhao Shi died of illness in Hong Kong, while Zhao Bing died when the Song loyalist Lu Xiufu put him on his shoulders and jumped off a cliff following the defeat of Song by the Yuan at the naval Battle of Yamen.

Yuan dynasty
After the Song dynasty was overthrown by the Yuan dynasty in 1279, local residents inscribed the words "Sung Wong Toi" on this large rock that was on the Sacred Hill at that time.

Note that the Chinese character 王 (pinyin wáng, meaning king) is carved in the stone instead of the conventional character 皇 (pinyin huáng, meaning emperor). Both 王 and 皇 are pronounced as "Wong" in Cantonese. This may have been done by the locals to avoid angering the Yuan emperors. The Hong Kong government (while under British rule) in 1959 recognized the nature of this intentional word choice, preferred using the character for "emperor" (皇) to name the surrounding locations associated with Sung Wong Toi, namely the park built for settling the trimmed monolith, the nearby road and the metro station.

Qing dynasty
In 1807, seven smaller characters were added on the right side of the stone to record the renovation work during the reign of the Jiaqing Emperor.

Japanese occupation
During the Japanese occupation of Hong Kong in 1941–1945, the boulder was dislodged from its place when the Sacred Hill was levelled for an extension of the Kai Tak Airport. A portion of the rock inscribed with Chinese characters survived the blasting operation. That part of the boulder, about one-third of its original size, displays the Chinese name of the stone, "Sung Wong Toi".

Post-World War II

After World War II, this portion of the stone was shaped into a rectangular block and moved to the Sung Wong Toi Garden, a small park especially constructed for it. This park is located in the present-day Kowloon City District, at the junction of Sung Wong Toi Road and Ma Tau Chung Road, which is close to the stone's original site. The construction work of the park was completed in the winter of 1945.

The park was planned be relocated to nearby Kai Tak Development as Sung Wong Toi Park.

See also
 List of urban public parks and gardens of Hong Kong
 List of buildings and structures in Hong Kong
 History of Hong Kong
 Sung Wong Toi station
 Emperor Duanzong
 Zhao Bing

References

In search of the past: a guide to the antiquities of Hong Kong 香港文物志, The Urban Council of Hong Kong, 1988.

Further reading

External links
An account about the boulder
Film Services Office
Maps by Centamap
The Geographical Information System on Hong Kong Heritage
Hong Kong Fun in 18 Districts – Welcome to 18 Districts
Description and History

History of Hong Kong
Song dynasty
Urban public parks and gardens in Hong Kong
Monuments and memorials in Hong Kong
Ma Tau Chung